The European Water Polo Championship is a sport competition for national water polo teams, currently held biannually and organized by the Ligue Européenne de Natation (LEN), the governing European aquatics federation. There are both men's and women's competitions.

The first European Water Polo Championship was held in 1926 in Budapest, Hungary, with just a men's competition. The women for the first time competed in 1985 (Oslo, Norway) for the European title. The water polo tournament was part of the European Aquatics Championships up to and including 1997, and from 1999 the event was separated and got its own independent tournament.

Men's tournament

Results

Medal table

Participation details

Notes

Most successful players

Boldface denotes active water polo players and highest medal count among all players (including these who not included in these tables) per type.

Multiple gold medalists

Multiple medalists
The table shows players who have won at least 6 medals in total at the European Championships.

Women's tournament

Results

Medal table

Participation details

Most successful players

Boldface denotes active water polo players and highest medal count among all players (including these who not included in these tables) per type.

Multiple gold medalists

Multiple medalists
The table shows players who have won at least 6 medals in total at the European Championships.

Combined medal table

References

Sources

Results
 Men Water Polo Europe Championships Archive
 Women Water Polo Europe Championships Archive

External links

LEN.eu | Ligue Européenne de Natation – Official LEN website
Sports123
Winning Squads & Stats
Water Polo European Cups Archive

 
European Water Polo Championship
Recurring sporting events established in 1926
International water polo competitions
water polo